Nick Gale,  better known as Digital Farm Animals, is a British songwriter, music producer and DJ known for wearing an electronic pig helmet. He has featured on and co-written numerous tracks that have reached the top 10 of the UK Singles Chart, including "Don't Play", "Really Love", and "Back to You".

Career
Gale has worked as a writer and producer with artists including Noah Cyrus, Dua Lipa, Danny Ocean, Becky G, Alan Walker, Hailee Steinfeld, Jason Derulo, Galantis, will.i.am, Little Mix, Rvssian, Louisa Johnson, Nelly, Marlon Roudette, Anne-Marie, INNA, Kain Rivers, Louis Tomlinson, KSI, Annika Rose, Craig David, Sigma, Nathan Evans, Cash Cash and others.

As a DJ, he has performed at festivals and venues around the world, including Tomorrowland, Mysteryland, V Fest, Boardmasters and Ministry of Sound Club. In 2015, Digital Farm Animals signed a record deal with record label Syco Entertainment and in 2019 he signed with Arista Records. Digital Farm Animals is now an independent artist and producer. He has worked closely with KSI on his 2021 album 'All Over the Place', co-writing and producing 5 tracks on the album.

Discography

Singles

As lead artist

As featured artist

Songwriting and production credits

Awards and nominations

References

Notes

Sources

Year of birth missing (living people)
Living people
People from Stanmore
English DJs
English record producers
English male singers
English songwriters
Remixers
British male songwriters